Conversational narcissism is a term used by sociologist Charles Derber in his book, The Pursuit of Attention: Power and Ego in Everyday Life.

Derber observed that the social support system in America is relatively weak, and this leads people to compete mightily for attention. In social situations, they tend to steer the conversation away from others and toward themselves. "Conversational narcissism is the key manifestation of the dominant attention-getting psychology in America," he wrote. "It occurs in informal conversations among friends, family and coworkers. The profusion of popular literature about listening and the etiquette of managing those who talk constantly about themselves suggests its pervasiveness in everyday life."

What Derber describes as "conversational narcissism" often occurs subtly rather than overtly because it is prudent to avoid being judged an egotist.

Derber distinguishes the "shift-response" from the "support-response".

References

Oral communication
Narcissism